Digi Plus (or simply Plus) was an Albanian television channel broadcasting American, Italian and German series. It was founded in 2004 when DigitAlb was created. 

In October 2013, Digi Plus in its standard definition form was fused with the channel T, creating the channel T-Plus. In the meantime, Plus was still available in high definition as Plus HD. On 1 June 2017, Plus HD was replaced by Family HD, while T-Plus was replaced by T HD.

Programming

References

Digitalb television networks
Television channels and stations established in 2004
Mass media in Tirana